Amira Spahić (born 8 June 1983) is a Bosnian professional football midfielder who plays for Bosnia and Herzegovina Women's Premier League club SFK 2000 and the Bosnia and Herzegovina women's national team.

Honours

Player

Club
Travnik 
Bosnian Women's Cup: 2004–05

SFK 2000 
Bosnian Women's Premier League: 2010–11, 2011–12, 2012–13, 2013–14, 2014–15, 2015–16, 2016–17, 2017–18, 2018–19
Bosnian Women's Cup: 2010–11, 2011–12, 2012–13, 2013–14, 2014–15, 2015–16, 2016–17, 2017–18, 2018–19

References

External links
Amira Spahić at Sofascore

1983 births
Living people
Bosnia and Herzegovina women's footballers
Women's association football midfielders
Bosnia and Herzegovina women's international footballers